The United States census of 1890 was taken beginning June 2, 1890, but most of the 1890 census materials were destroyed in 1921 when a building caught fire and in the subsequent disposal of the remaining damaged records. It determined the resident population of the United States to be 62,979,766an increase of 25.5 percent over the 50,189,209 persons enumerated during the 1880 census. The data reported that the distribution of the population had resulted in the disappearance of the American frontier. 

This was the first census in which a majority of states recorded populations of over one million, as well as the first in which multiple citiesNew York as of 1880, Chicago, and Philadelphiarecorded populations of over one million. The census also saw Chicago rise in rank to the nation's second most populous city, a position it would hold until Los Angeles (then 57th) would supplant it in 1990. This was the first U.S. census to use machines to tabulate the collected data.

Census questions 

The 1890 census collected the following information:

Methodology 

The 1890 census was the first to be compiled using methods invented by Herman Hollerith and was overseen by Superintendents Robert P. Porter (1889–1893) and  Carroll D. Wright (1893–1897). Data was entered on a machine readable medium (punched cards) and tabulated by machine. Changes from the 1880 census included the larger population, the number of data items to be collected from individuals, the Census Bureau headcount, the volume of scheduled publications, and the use of Hollerith's electromechanical tabulators. The net effect of these changes was to reduce the time required to process the census from eight years for the 1880 census to six years for the 1890 census. The total population of 62,947,714, the family, or rough, count, was announced after only six weeks of processing (punched cards were not used for this tabulation). The public reaction to this tabulation was disbelief, as it was widely believed that the "right answer" was at least 75,000,000.

Significant findings 

The United States census of 1890 showed a total of 248,253 Native Americans living in the United States, down from  400,764 Native Americans identified in the census of 1850.

The 1890 census announced that the frontier region of the United States no longer existed, and that the Census Bureau would no longer track the westward migration of the U.S. population.

By 1890, settlement in the American West had reached sufficient population density that the frontier line had disappeared. For the 1890 census, the Census Bureau released a bulletin declaring the closing of the frontier, stating: "Up to and including 1880 the country had a frontier of settlement, but at present the unsettled area has been so broken into by isolated bodies of settlement that there can hardly be said to be a frontier line. In the discussion of its extent, its westward movement, etc., it can not, therefore, any longer have a place in the census reports."

Data availability 

The original data for the 1890 census is mostly unavailable. The population schedules were damaged in a fire in the basement of the Commerce Building in Washington, D.C. in 1921. Some 25% of the materials were presumed destroyed and another 50% damaged by smoke and water (although the actual damage may have been closer to 15–25%). The damage to the records led to an outcry for a permanent National Archives. In December 1932, following standard federal record-keeping procedures, the Chief Clerk of the Bureau of the Census sent the Librarian of Congress a list of papers to be destroyed, including the original 1890 census schedules. The Librarian was asked by the Bureau to identify any records which should be retained for historical purposes, but the Librarian did not accept the census records. Congress authorized destruction of that list of records on February 21, 1933, and the surviving original 1890 census records were destroyed by government order by 1934 or 1935. Few sets of microdata from the 1890 census survive. Aggregate data for small areas, together with compatible cartographic boundary files, can be downloaded from the National Historical Geographic Information System.

State rankings

City rankings

References

External links 

 Mayo-Smith, Richmond (1891), "The Eleventh Census of the United States". In: The Economic Journal (EJ), Vol. 1, pp. 43–58 (in  Wikisource)
 1891 U.S Census Report Contains 1890 census results
 Historical US Census data from the U.S. Census Bureau website
 Hollerith 1890 Census Tabulator by Columbia University
 "The Fate of the 1890 Population Census" from the National Archives website

United States Census, 1890
United States
1921 fires in the United States
United States census
Building and structure fires in the United States
Fires in Washington, D.C.
Lost historical records